Lukáš Bláha (born June 1, 1996) is a Czech professional ice hockey player. He is currently playing for Piráti Chomutov of the Czech Extraliga.

Bláha made his Czech Extraliga debut playing with Piráti Chomutov during the 2015-16 Czech Extraliga season.

References

External links

1996 births
Living people
Piráti Chomutov players
Czech ice hockey defencemen
Czech expatriate ice hockey people
Expatriate ice hockey players in France
Czech expatriate sportspeople in France